The Denver Broncos are a professional American football franchise based in Denver, Colorado. They are members of the West Division of the American Football Conference (AFC) in the National Football League (NFL). The team began playing in 1960 as a charter member of the American Football League (AFL), and joined the NFL as part of the AFL-NFL merger. The team has played their home games at Empower Field at Mile High since . 

There have been 20 head coaches for the Broncos franchise as of 2023. The franchise's first head coach was Frank Filchock, who coached until . Mike Shanahan is the franchise's all-time leader for the most regular season games coached (208), the most regular season game wins (130), and the most playoff game wins (8). Shanahan and Dan Reeves, are tied for the most playoffs games coached (13). Shanahan was the first Broncos head coach to win a Super Bowl following the 1997 season, and repeated the feat following the 1998 season. The Broncos next Super Bowl victory was for Super Bowl 50 following the 2015 season under the leadership of coach Gary Kubiak who had previously played for Denver and served as an assistant coach.  Jack Faulkner, John Ralston, Red Miller, and Reeves have been named the United Press International (UPI) NFL Coach of the Year, at least once with the Broncos. Filchock, Faulkner, Mac Speedie, Jerry Smith, Ralston, and Miller spent their entire coaching careers with the Broncos. Speedie, Ray Malavasi, Miller, Shanahan, and Kubiak had been assistant coaches with the Broncos before they became head coaches with the Broncos. The most recent head coach of the Broncos was Sean Payton, who was hired on January 31, 2023.



Key

Head coaches
Note: Statistics are accurate through the end of the 2021 NFL season.

Notes

References
General
 

Specific

Denver Broncos
 
Head coaches